Lohmüller is a German surname.

List of persons with the surname Lohmüller
 Martin Nicholas Lohmuller (1919-2017), American prelate of the Roman Catholic Church
 Otto Lohmüller (born 1943), German artist from Gengenbach, Baden-Württemberg
 Gyuri Lohmuller (born 1962), Romanian contemporary artist from Gataia, Romania

See also 
 Lohmühle
 Lohmiller

German-language surnames